Rudolf Vogel (April 18, 1906 – June 4, 1991) was a German politician of the Christian Democratic Union (CDU) and former member of the German Bundestag.

Life 
He was a member of the German Bundestag from its first election in 1949 until 15 April 1964. He represented the constituency of Aalen in parliament. From 1949 to 1953 Vogel was chairman of the Bundestag committee for press, radio and film issues.

Literature

References

1906 births
1991 deaths
Members of the Bundestag for Baden-Württemberg
Members of the Bundestag 1961–1965
Members of the Bundestag 1957–1961
Members of the Bundestag 1953–1957
Members of the Bundestag 1949–1953
Members of the Bundestag for the Christian Democratic Union of Germany